The women's points race competition at the 2019  UEC European Track Championships was held on 19 October 2019.

Results
100 laps (25 km) were raced with 10 sprints.

References

Women's points race
European Track Championships – Women's points race